John Dorset was an English politician who was MP for Lyme Regis in September 1388, January 1390, 1391, and 1395, and mayor of Lyme Regis from 1397 to 1398. History of Parliament Online theorises that he was a son of Thomas Dorset.

References

English MPs September 1388
English MPs January 1390
English MPs 1391
English MPs 1395
Members of the Parliament of England (pre-1707) for Lyme Regis
Mayors of places in Dorset
14th-century births